Hege Reitan (born 15 September 1970) is a Norwegian sport wrestler. Her achievements include a bronze medal at the world championships and twice national champion.

Career
Reitan became Norwegian champion in 1987 and 1988.

She won a bronze medal at the 1987 World Wrestling Championships in Lørenskog.

Personal life
Reitan was born in Kristiansund on 15 September 1970.

References

1970 births
Living people
Norwegian female sport wrestlers
World Wrestling Championships medalists
20th-century Norwegian women